Lakshipur is a village in Jharkhand, India.

References

Villages in Bokaro district